

Group A

Cuba
Head Coach: Fidel Salazar

Guatemala

Head coach:  Juan Manuel Funes

Honduras
Head Coach:  José Valladares

Jamaica
Head Coach:  Andrew Edwards

Trinidad and Tobago

Head coach: Shawn Cooper

United States
Head Coach:  Richie Williams

Group B

Canada
Head Coach:  Sean Fleming

Costa Rica

Head coach:  Marcelo Herrera

Haiti

Head coach:  Marc Chèze

Mexico

Head Coach:  Mario Arteaga

Panama

Head coach: Juan Carlos Cubillas

Saint Lucia

Head coach:  Cassim Louis

References

CONCACAF U-17 Championship squads
squads